Normative isomorphic change is driven by pressures brought about by professions. One mode is the legitimization inherent in the licensing and crediting of educational achievement. The other is the inter-organizational networks that span organizations. Norms developed during education are entered into organizations. Inter-hiring between existing industrial firms also encourages isomorphism.

People from the same educational backgrounds will approach problems in much the same way. Socialization on the job reinforces these conformities.

Normative isomorphism is in contrast to mimetic isomorphism, where uncertainty encourages imitation, and similar to coercive isomorphism, where organizations are forced to change by external forces.

References 

Organizational theory